Christine Leigh Heyrman is an American historian.

Life
She graduated from Macalester College in 1971, and from Yale University with a Ph.D. in 1977.
She is Grimble Professor of American History at the University of Delaware.
Her current research focuses on the first cohort of American Protestant missionaries in the Middle East (1820–1860).

Awards

1998 Bancroft Prize
2016 Francis Parkman Prize

Works
Heyrman, Christine Leigh. “The Separation of Church and State from the American Revolution to the Early Republic.” Divining America, National Humanities Center
 
 
    (6th ed., 2007)
 American Apostles: When Evangelicals Entered the World of Islam Farrar, Straus, and Giroux, 2015. .

References

External links
"Nation of Nations: A Concise Narrative of the American Republic, 3/e', online learning center

21st-century American historians
Macalester College alumni
Yale University alumni
University of Delaware faculty
Living people
American women historians
21st-century American women writers
Year of birth missing (living people)
Bancroft Prize winners